The Vaga River front  (Vaga front) was a front of the engagament of the Red Army and the Allied forces during the  Allied intervention in the Russian Civil War.

Established along the Vaga River, a tributary of Northern Dvina, it was the southernmost line of advance of the Allied in the North Russia Campaign. Initially its purpose was to outflank the retreating Red Army, but when the tide turned it was vital to secure the Allied right flank on the Northern Dvina front.

References

1918 in Russia
1919 in Russia
Battles of the Russian Civil War involving the United States
Battles of the Russian Civil War involving the United Kingdom
20th-century military history of the United States
Battles of the Russian Civil War
Allied intervention in the Russian Civil War